The Oxford Centre for Hebrew and Jewish Studies (OCHJS) is a recognised independent centre of the University of Oxford, England. Its research fellows teach on a variety of undergraduate and master's degrees in Oriental studies, and it publishes the Journal of Jewish Studies.

History and case statement
The centre was founded in 1972 by Dr David Patterson to help restore Jewish Studies in Europe in the aftermath of the Holocaust. Currently it is based in the Clarendon Institute, Walton Street, Oxford, OX1 2HG, having relocated from Yarnton Manor in 2014. It is a registered charity and a company limited by guarantee incorporated in England, under English law. Today, it is the leading academic Jewish studies centre in Europe. Its Fellows and Lecturers provide courses in Hebrew and Jewish studies for undergraduates and postgraduates up to doctoral level in many faculties within the University of Oxford. The centre also promotes Jewish studies based on the Bodleian Library's Hebrew and Jewish collections by supporting research, by development projects, and by shared staffing with the centre's Leopold Muller Memorial Library.

Leopold Muller Memorial Library

The centre's library is named the Leopold Muller Memorial Library. It is housed in the basement of the Clarendon Institute.  It comprises one of the best collections of books and periodicals in Jewish Studies in Europe and serves as a resource for scholars, students and visiting fellows of the centre. The core of the Library consists of several rare collections and archives; among those one finds a large collection of materials donated by Rabbi Louis Jacobs, Loewe Pamphlets Collection from Herbert Loewe and his elder son, the library of Jacob H. Coppenhagen (1913–1997), Kressel Archive, Foyle-Montefiore Collection (which incorporates the library of Leopold Zunz), Lipson-Shandel and Moses Montefiore Archives of rare documentation regarding life and activities of Sir Moses Montefiore, one of the largest collections of Yizkor Books in Europe – it counts over 800 memorial volumes for communities destroyed in the Holocaust, and the Archive of Rabbi Hugo Gryn. Among the Library's most recent enterprises are the Digital Haskalah Library project and the Raphael Loewe Archives Digital Exhibition.

Notable academics

 Norman Solomon
 Géza Vermes

List of presidents

 David Patterson (1972–1992)
 Philip Alexander (1992–1995)
 Bernard Wasserstein (1996–2000
 Peter Oppenheimer (2000–2008)
 David Ariel (2008–2014)
 Martin Goodman (2014–2018) 
 Judith Olszowy-Schlanger (2018–)

Emeritus governors
Martin Blackman
Elizabeth Corob
Michael Garston OBE
Sir Richard Greenbury
Professor Alan Jones
The Lord Marks of Broughton
Peter Oppenheimer
Felix Posen
Sir Maurice Shock
Dennis Trevelyan, CB
The Rt Hon The Lord Woolf
The Rt Hon The Lord Young CH DL

References

External links

 Oxford Centre for Hebrew and Jewish Studies website
 Journal of Jewish Studies website
 Hebrew and Jewish Studies in the Faculty of Oriental Studies – University of Oxford website
 Digital Haskalah Library website
 Raphael Loewe Archives Digital Exhibition

1972 establishments in England
Asian studies
Departments of the University of Oxford
Judaic studies
Jewish studies research institutes
Organisations associated with the University of Oxford
Religious charities based in the United Kingdom

ms:Pusat Oxford untuk Pengajian bahasa Ibrani dan agama Yahudi